Ampelopsis cordata, commonly called heartleaf peppervine, heart-leaf peppervine, or heart leaf peppervine, is a vine found in the U.S. states Alabama, Arkansas, Connecticut, Delaware, Florida, Georgia, Iowa, Illinois, Indiana, Kansas, Kentucky, Louisiana, Maryland, Missouri, Mississippi, North Carolina, Nebraska, Ohio, Oklahoma, South Carolina, Tennessee, Texas, Virginia, West Virginia. It grows in open woodlands, flood plains, and river banks.

References

cordata
Flora of the United States